Badar Express is a passenger train operated daily by Pakistan Railways between Lahore and Faisalabad.

Route 
 Lahore Junction–Shahdara Bagh Junction via Karachi–Peshawar Railway Line
 Shahdara Bagh Junction–Sangla Hill Junction via Shahdara Bagh–Sangla Hill Branch Line
 Sangla Hill Junction–Faisalabad via Khanewal–Wazirabad Branch Line

Station stops

Equipment 
Badar Express only offers economy class seating.

References 

Named passenger trains of Pakistan
Passenger trains in Pakistan